There are over 9,000 Grade I listed buildings in England. This page is a list of these buildings in the district of Scarborough in North Yorkshire.

Scarborough

|}

Notes

External links

Scarborough (borough)
Borough of Scarborough
Lists of Grade I listed buildings in North Yorkshire